A skeleton suit was an outfit of clothing for small boys, popular from about 1790 to the late 1820s, after which it increasingly lost favor with the advent of trousers. It consisted of a tight short- or long-sleeved coat or jacket buttoned to a pair of high-waisted trousers. Skeleton suits are often described as one of the earliest fashions to be specifically tailored for children, rather than being adult fashions sized down. Previously (and subsequently) young boys wore dresses until they were breeched, or put into trousers.

Charles Dickens describes a skeleton suit as "one of those straight blue cloth cases in which small boys used to be confined, before belts and tunics had come in, and old notions had gone out: an ingenious contrivance for displaying the full symmetry of a boy's figure, by fastening him into a very tight jacket, with an ornamental row of buttons over each shoulder, and then buttoning his trousers over it, so as to give his legs the appearance of being hooked on, just under the armpits" (Sketches by Boz, 1836). Despite Dickens' assertions, skeleton suits were made in various colors. They were usually worn with a white blouse or shirt trimmed with lace or ruffles.

Skeleton suits are one of the children's nostalgic Regency fashions typical of the illustrations of Kate Greenaway.

References

Baumgarten, Linda: What Clothes Reveal: The Language of Clothing in Colonial and Federal America, Yale University Press, 2002.  

1790s fashion
19th-century fashion
Children's clothing
History of clothing (Western fashion)
Suits (clothing)